KROB (1510 AM, The Conjunto Station) is a radio station broadcasting a Conjunto/Tejano music format. It is licensed to Robstown, Texas, United States, and serves the Corpus Christi area.  The station is owned by Claro Communications, AKA B Communications Joint Venture.
It also broadcasts on FM, using the K232DE translator on 94.3 in Corpus Christi.

1510 AM is a United States clear-channel frequency, on which WLAC in Nashville, Tennessee is the dominant Class A station.  KROB must leave the air from sunset to sunrise to prevent interference to the WLAC nighttime skywave signal.

History
KROB went on the air in 1963 to serve the farming community of Robstown with a country music format.  The station was licensed for operation daytime hours only.  In 1966 KROB added a sister FM station, KROB-FM 99.9, to simulcast the AM station and to provide nighttime service.  KROB-FM is now KSAB-FM.  KROB was assigned the call letters KGLF on August 1, 1993.  On October 9, 2002, the station changed its call sign back to KROB.
An FM translator was added in the late 2000s to allow KROB FM service.

References

External links
KROB Facebook

ROB
ROB